Puygros (Arpitan: Puégrôs) is a commune in the Savoie department in the Auvergne-Rhône-Alpes region in Southeastern France. In 2019, it had a population of 379.

See also
Communes of the Savoie department

References

External links

Official site

Communes of Savoie